The American Association for Geriatric Psychiatry is a learned society of professionals aiming to improve the quality of life for the elderly population, promote a healthy aging process, and a greater awareness of geriatric mental health issues.

History 
The association was founded in 1978 by 11 professionals who were concerned about the issues that uniquely affect older adults' mental health and well-being. The organization was founded at a time when the percentage of older adults in the United States was growing, which made this organization particularly important. Now, the association has nearly 2,000 members, including psychiatrists and other health care professionals, across the United States, Canada, and abroad.

Past presidents 
The following persons have been president of the association:

Public outreach 
The Geriatric Mental Health Foundation is a not-for-profit, 501(c)3 organization created by the association to promote awareness of geriatric psychiatry, to reduce mental health stigmas, and to educate the public about mental health issues which disproportionately affect the elderly. Additionally, the foundation focuses on prevention of these late-in-life disorders, and promotes healthy aging practices.

Notable programs 
In 2005, three members from the board of directors at the Geriatric Mental Health Foundation participated as delegates at the White House Conference on Aging. At this conference, they recommended many resolutions such as: the reform and enhancement of Medicaid and Medicare programs, improved mental health care, particularly for older adults, adequate transportation methods for older adults, and the re-authorization of the Older Americans Act.

Position statements 
 Mental health and medical care of older adults: The association believes that mental health care for older adults is crucial, and should be covered by insurance companies, regardless of where these adults receive their care. They also believe that mental health care for older adults should be integrated into a comprehensive health care system which provides "accessible, affordable, and culturally appropriate" care. Additionally, they believe that advisory boards for managed care providers should include geriatricians and geriatric psychiatrists, to guarantee that the provided coverage appropriately meets the needs of the patients. The association also suggests that healthcare providers receive training on the unique challenges and aspects of geriatric mental health care. Finally, they stress the importance of federal funding and research concerning late-life mental disorders.
 Psychologist prescribing privileges: In 2004, the association released a statement that psychologists should not be allowed to prescribe medications. Though the association believes that it is a divisive topic within psychology, they believe that because psychologists have no medical training or authority, they are not qualified to prescribe medications. They believe that allowing psychologists to prescribe medications could prevent patients from receiving collaborative treatment and that it is unnecessary to provide psychologists prescribing powers since psychiatrists and physicians already have that power.
 End-of-life care: The association believes that end-of-life care must be respectful of both patient and family wishes, but that care should be consistent with the patient's desires. End-of-life care should focus on relieving both mental and physical pain, and improving quality of life. The association believes that caregivers should explore all available care and treatment options with the patient, but that patients and authorized surrogates have the right to refuse treatment. The organization believes that if a patient's ability to make decisions is impaired, decisions should be made by an authorized surrogate.
 Additionally, the association believes that patients should be guaranteed continued access to care, regardless of financial status. The organization also stresses the importance of appropriate funding for empirically based research on improving end-of-life care. Finally, the association suggests that all health care professionals receive continual and inclusive training on end-of-life care.

Publications 
The association publishes The American Journal of Geriatric Psychiatry According to the Journal Citation Reports, the journal has a 2013 impact factor of 3.519.

Notable articles 
The journal has published the following notable articles:
 Localization of Neurofibrillary Tangles and Beta-Amyloid Plaques in the Brains of Living Patients with Alzheimer Disease. Shoghi-Jadid, K., Small, G. W., Agdeppa, E. D., Kepe, V., Ercoli, L. M., Siddarth, P., Read, S., Satyamurthy, N., Petric, A., Huang, S., & Barrio, J. R. (2002)
 Efficacy and Adverse Effects of Atypical Antipsychotics for Dementia: Meta-analysis of Randomized, Placebo-Controlled Trials. Schneider, L. S., Dagerman, K., & Insel, P. S. (2006).
 Preserved Cognition in Patients with Early Alzheimer Disease and Amnestic Mild Cognitive Impairment During Treatment with Rosiglitazone: A Preliminary Study. Watson, G. S., Cholerton, B. A., Reger, M. A., Baker, L. D., Plymate, S. R., Asthana, S., Fishel, M. A., Kulstad, J. J., Green, P. S., Cook, D. G., Kahn, S. E., Keeling, M. L., & Craft, S. (2005).

References

External links 
 

1978 establishments in the United States
Mental health organizations in Virginia
Scientific organizations established in 1978
Psychiatric associations